A dimensionless quantity (also known as a bare quantity, pure quantity, or scalar quantity as well as quantity of dimension one) is a quantity to which no physical dimension is assigned, with a corresponding SI unit of measurement of one (or 1), which is not explicitly shown. Dimensionless quantities are widely used in many fields, such as mathematics, physics, chemistry, engineering, and economics. Dimensionless quantities are distinct from quantities that have associated dimensions, such as time (measured in seconds). Dimensionless units are dimensionless values that serve as units of measurement for expressing other quantities, such as radians (rad) or steradians (sr) for plane angles and solid angles, respectively. For example, optical extent is defined as having units of metres multiplied by steradians.

History 

Quantities having dimension one, dimensionless quantities, regularly occur in sciences, and are formally treated within the field of dimensional analysis. In the nineteenth century, French mathematician Joseph Fourier and Scottish physicist James Clerk Maxwell led significant developments in the modern concepts of dimension and unit. Later work by British physicists Osborne Reynolds and Lord Rayleigh contributed to the understanding of dimensionless numbers in physics. Building on Rayleigh's method of dimensional analysis, Edgar Buckingham proved the  theorem (independently of French mathematician Joseph Bertrand's previous work) to formalize the nature of these quantities.

Numerous dimensionless numbers, mostly ratios, were coined in the early 1900s,  particularly in the areas of fluid mechanics and heat transfer. Measuring ratios in the (derived) unit dB (decibel) finds widespread use nowadays.

There have been periodic proposals to "patch" the SI system to reduce confusion regarding physical dimensions. For example, a 2017 op-ed in Nature argued for formalizing the radian as a physical unit. The idea was rebutted on the grounds that such a change would raise inconsistencies for both established dimensionless groups, like the Strouhal number, and for mathematically distinct entities that happen to have the same units, like torque (a vector product) versus energy (a scalar product). In another instance in the early 2000s, the International Committee for Weights and Measures discussed naming the unit of 1 as the "uno", but the idea of just introducing a new SI name for 1 was dropped.

Integers 
Integer numbers may be used to represent discrete dimensionless quantities. 
More specifically, counting numbers can be used to express countable quantities, such as the number of particles and population size. In mathematics, the "number of elements" in a set is termed cardinality. Countable nouns is a related linguistics concept.
Counting numbers, such as number of bits, can be compounded with units of frequency (inverse second) to derive units of count rate, such as bits per second.
Count data is a related concept in statistics.

Ratios, proportions, and angles 
Dimensionless quantities are often obtained as ratios of quantities that are not dimensionless, but whose dimensions cancel out in the mathematical operation. Examples include calculating slopes or unit conversion factors. A more complex example of such a ratio is engineering strain, a measure of physical deformation defined as a change in length divided by the initial length. Since both quantities have the dimension length, their ratio is dimensionless. Another set of examples is mass fractions or mole fractions often written using parts-per notation such as ppm (= 10−6), ppb (= 10−9), and ppt (= 10−12), or perhaps confusingly as ratios of two identical units (kg/kg or mol/mol).

Other common proportions are percentages % (= 0.01),  ‰ (= 0.001) and angle units such as turn, radian, degree (° = ) and grad (= ). In statistics the coefficient of variation is the ratio of the standard deviation to the mean and is used to measure the dispersion in the data.

For example, moisture content may be defined as a ratio of volumes (volumetric moisture, m3⋅m−3, dimension L⋅L) or as a ratio of masses (gravimetric moisture, units kg⋅kg−1, dimension M⋅M); both would be unitless quantities, but of different dimension.

Buckingham  theorem 

The Buckingham  theorem indicates that validity of the laws of physics does not depend on a specific unit system. A statement of this theorem is that any physical law can be expressed as an identity involving only dimensionless combinations (ratios or products) of the variables linked by the law (e. g., pressure and volume are linked by Boyle's Law – they are inversely proportional). If the dimensionless combinations' values changed with the systems of units, then the equation would not be an identity, and Buckingham's theorem would not hold.

Another consequence of the theorem is that the functional dependence between a certain number (say, n) of variables can be reduced by the number (say, k) of independent dimensions occurring in those variables to give a set of p = n − k independent, dimensionless quantities. For the purposes of the experimenter, different systems that share the same description by dimensionless quantity are equivalent.

Example 
To demonstrate the application of the  theorem, consider the power consumption of a stirrer with a given shape.
The power, P, in dimensions [M · L2/T3], is a function of the density, ρ [M/L3], and the viscosity of the fluid to be stirred, μ [M/(L · T)], as well as the size of the stirrer given by its diameter, D [L], and the angular speed of the stirrer, n [1/T]. Therefore, we have a total of n = 5 variables representing our example.  Those n = 5 variables are built up from k = 3 independent dimensions, e.g., length: L (SI units: m), time: T (s), and mass: M (kg).

According to the -theorem, the n = 5 variables can be reduced by the k = 3 dimensions to form p = n − k = 5 − 3 = 2 independent dimensionless numbers.

Note that the two dimensionless quantities are not unique and depend on which of the n = 5 variables are chosen as the k = 3 dimensionally independent basis variables, which, in this example, appear in both dimensionless quantities. The Reynolds number and power number fall from the above analysis if , n, and D are chosen to be the basis variables. If, instead, n, and D are selected, the Reynolds number is recovered while the second dimensionless quantity becomes . We note that  is the product of the Reynolds number and the power number.

Dimensionless physical constants 

Certain universal dimensioned physical constants, such as the speed of light in vacuum, the universal gravitational constant, the Planck constant, the Coulomb constant, and the Boltzmann constant can be normalized to 1 if appropriate units for time, length, mass, charge, and temperature are chosen. The resulting system of units is known as the natural units, specifically regarding these five constants, Planck units. However, not all physical constants can be normalized in this fashion. For example, the values of the following constants are independent of the system of units, cannot be defined, and can only be determined experimentally:
 α ≈ 1/137, the fine-structure constant, which characterizes the magnitude of the electromagnetic interaction between electrons.
 β (or μ) ≈ 1836, the proton-to-electron mass ratio. This ratio is the rest mass of the proton divided by that of the electron. An analogous ratio can be defined for any elementary particle;
 αs ≈ 1, a constant characterizing the strong nuclear force coupling strength;
 The ratio of the mass of any given elementary particle to the Planck mass, .

Other quantities produced by nondimensionalization 

Physics often uses dimensionless quantities to simplify the characterization of systems with multiple interacting physical phenomena.  These may be found by applying the Buckingham  theorem or otherwise may emerge from making partial differential equations unitless by the process of nondimensionalization. Engineering, economics, and other fields often extend these ideas in design and analysis of the relevant systems.

Physics and engineering 
 Fresnel number – wavenumber over distance
 Mach number – ratio of the speed of an object or flow relative to the speed of sound in the fluid.

 Beta (plasma physics) – ratio of plasma pressure to magnetic pressure, used in magnetospheric physics as well as fusion plasma physics.
 Damköhler numbers (Da) – used in chemical engineering to relate the chemical reaction timescale (reaction rate) to the transport phenomena rate occurring in a system.
 Thiele modulus – describes the relationship between diffusion and reaction rate in porous catalyst pellets with no mass transfer limitations.
 Numerical aperture – characterizes the range of angles over which the system can accept or emit light.
 Sherwood number – (also called the mass transfer Nusselt number) is a dimensionless number used in mass-transfer operation. It represents the ratio of the convective mass transfer to the rate of diffusive mass transport.
 Schmidt number – defined as the ratio of momentum diffusivity (kinematic viscosity) and mass diffusivity, and is used to characterize fluid flows in which there are simultaneous momentum and mass diffusion convection processes.
 Reynolds number is commonly used in fluid mechanics to characterize flow, incorporating both properties of the fluid and the flow. It is interpreted as the ratio of inertial forces to viscous forces and can indicate flow regime as well as correlate to frictional heating in application to flow in pipes.
 Zukoski number, usually noted Q*, is the ratio of the heat release rate of a fire to the enthalpy of the gas flow rate circulating through the fire. Accidental and natural fires usually have a Q* of ~1. Flat spread fires such as forest fires have Q*<1. Fires originating from pressured vessels or pipes, with additional momentum caused by pressure, have Q*>>>1.

Chemistry 
 Relative density – density relative to water
 Relative atomic mass, Standard atomic weight
 Equilibrium constant (which is sometimes dimensionless)

Other fields 
 Cost of transport is the efficiency in moving from one place to another
 Elasticity is the measurement of the proportional change of an economic variable in response to a change in another

See also 
 Arbitrary unit
 Dimensional analysis
 Normalization (statistics) and standardized moment, the analogous concepts in statistics
 Orders of magnitude (numbers)
 Similitude (model)
 List of dimensionless quantities

References

Further reading
   (15 pages)

External links
 

 
Mathematical concepts
Physical constants